Angino Buttress is a prominent buttress-type mountain near the center of the Skelton Icefalls in Victoria Land, Antarctica. It was named by the Advisory Committee on Antarctic Names in 1964 for Ernest E. Angino, geologist at McMurdo Station, 1959–60.

See also
Mount Metschel

References
 

Mountains of Oates Land